In German-speaking countries, the miner's toolset is known as a Gezähe (derived from gizouuun, zu zawen, gezawen – to be usable, advantageous) formerly also abbreviated to Gezäh. It is a set of personally-owned mining tools and equipment needed by the miner in his daily work.

In coal mining in central Europe during the 19th and 20th centuries, every miner had his own set of tools. So that they could not be stolen, before the end of his shift they were either locked in a tool chest (Gezähekiste) or threaded onto a tool ring (Gezähering) which was then locked. To that end, all tools had a hole or eyelet. Tools that were not part of a miner's personal equipment and were only needed now and then, could be issued to the miner in the tool store (Gezähekammer or Magazin) in return for a token (Gezähemarke). Most tools were marked with a number, which was either stamped or welded to the tool.

Typical implements 

 Abbauhammer or Boxer: a mechanical pick for mining by hand
 Bohrgezähe: blasting or shooting tools and accessories
 Dicker Hammer or Bello (colloquial): a 20 kg sledge hammer
 Grubenbeil: miner's hatchet, a special type of hatchet with a hammer head at the blunt end
 Kaukamm: a hatchet sharpened on one-side
 Gezähekiste: lockable tool chest
 Gezähering: lockable ring made of a circular iron ring
 Keilhaue: a pick (tool) with a single point
 Flügeleisen: a pick with two points, mainly used in historical coal mining to create the undercut and to extract coal 
 Breithaue: mattock adze or hoe with a wide blade for soft rock like clay or brown coal
 Kratze and Trog: paddle and basket or tub. The coal or ore material was shovelled into the basket using the paddle and then transported to the loading point
 Säge: historically a mechanical saw, in modern times a compressed air or electric chain saw used to cut wood for shoring
 Schlägel und Eisen: miner's hammer and chisel, also the symbol of mining hammer and pick
 Seifengabel: a type of fork, used open-cast tin mining, similar to a pitchfork. A washer (Seifner) diverted streams in order to wash out the granules of tin ore present in surface layers, a process called streaming or hushing. The fork was used to throw clumps of earth into the sluice or channel used. The names of the German towns of Seiffen (= "streaming") and Graupen (= "granules") were derived from this activity.

Schlackengabel or Firke: a slag fork, part of a smelter's tool set

Gallery

See also 
 Miner's habit
 Safety lamp

References

Literature 
 Walter Bischoff, Heinz Bramann: Das kleine Bergbaulexikon. Zusammengestellt am Studiengang Bergtechnik der Fachhochschule Bergbau. 7. neu bearbeitete und erweiterte Auflage. Verlag Glückauf GmbH, Essen 1988, .
 Konrad Wiedemann: Deutsches bergmännisches Gezähe von 1500 bis 1850. Aus dem Mittelalter in die Neuzeit. Ein Bericht. In: Lapis. 34, 6, 2009, pp. 19–24.

Mining equipment